Andrej Martin and Hans Podlipnik-Castillo won the title, defeating Marcelo Demoliner and Gastão Elias 6–4 , 3–6 , [10–6]

Seeds

Draw

Draw

References
 Main Draw

Uruguay Open - Doubles
Uruguay Open
2015 in Uruguayan tennis